Blackbox is the fourth studio album of the Norwegian band Major Parkinson.  It was released on 27 October 2017. The album features a new lineup and has an emphasis on dark, ambient electronica mixed with pop and prog rock.

The critical reception to the album has been positive.

Track listing 

 "Lover, Lower Me Down!"
 "Night Hitcher"
 "Before the Helmets"
 "Isabel: A Report to an Academy"
 "Scenes from Edison's Black Maria"
 "Madeleine Crumbles"
 "Baseball"
 "Strawberry Suicide"
 "Blackbox"

Personnel 

 Major Parkinson

 Jon Ivar Kolbotn – Lead vocals, lyrics, songwriting, arrangement
 Eivind Gammersvik – Bass, production, arrangement, backing vocals
 Lars Bjørknes – Piano, synth, organs, programming, notation, backing vocals
 Sondre Skollevoll – Guitars, backing vocals, additional synths, arrangement, microKORG (track 4)
 Sondre Sagstad Veland – Drums, perc, typewriter, arrangement, backing vocals
 Øystein Bech-Eriksen – Guitars, arrangement
 Claudia Cox: – Violin, backing vocals, arrangement

 Additional personnel

 Linn Frøkedal – Lead vocals 
 Carmen Boveda – Cello
 Jonas Flemsæter Hamre – Saxophone
 Joar Lemme – Trombone
 Gunleik Gisletveit – Tuba
 Logan Arndt – French horn
 Andreas Hesselberg Hatzikiriakidis – Trumpet
 Nataniel Hjønnevåg – Xylophone
 Thomas Rolland aka Lip Shaw – Whistling
 Megan Kovacs – Backing vocals  Female choir by Volve Vokal:
 Thea Meidell Sjule
 Idunn Strøm Myklebust
 Frida Ekerhovd
 Kaja Linder Henriksen
 Ann Christin Jenssen
 Kristine Norebø
 Signe Wiger
 Kine Granum
 Malene Moen Sætre
 Solveig Foldnes Dybsland

References 

2017 albums
Major Parkinson albums